John Gutenko (December 1, 1893 – October 18, 1963) was a Ukrainian-born American boxer of Danish and Polish heritage who fought under the name Kid Williams and was known as the Baltimore Tiger, he knocked out Johnny Coulon in Vernon, California, on June 9, 1914. This victory earned him the Bantamweight Championship world title. In 1970 Johnny Gutenko was inducted into the Ring magazine’s Boxing Hall of Fame after being nominated “by the sports editors, boxing writers, and television sportscasters.” At the time, the magazine’s founder Nat Fleischer ranked him number three among bantamweights. However, the website AinsworthSports.com rated him number one for the 1910 decade. Over twenty years later, he would be inducted into the International Boxing Hall of Fame. Ironically, the ceremony occurred in Canastota, New York, on June 9, 1996, the eighty-second anniversary of winning the bantamweight title.

Biography

John Gutenko was born at Rahó, Máramaros, Austria-Hungary (today part of Western Ukraine). Along with his mother, Aniela (born in Barkow, German Empire on November 7, 1876 – August 23, 1939), and his two brothers (Ludwik "Louis" and Rudolph) and two sisters (Bertha and Helen), they arrived in Baltimore on September 28, 1904, aboard the SS Breslau. John’s father, Wincenty Gutenko (born in Copenhagen, Denmark on May 4, 1866 – October 15, 1925), had immigrated earlier in the year. Wincenty arrived in New York before moving to Baltimore, where a large Polish Galician Community was located in the Fells’ Point neighborhood in southeast Baltimore City. 
Three more children were born in Baltimore: Zygmunt (Sigmund), born on June 27, 1905; Paulina Rita (Lena), born on August 28, 1908; and Elizabeth, born on August 23, 1910. The family worshipped at the Polish Roman Catholic Church of Our Lady of the Holy Rosary. There, he met his wife Agnieszka (Agnes) Zwiaskowska/Wiaskowska (died January 8, 1971). They were married on May 23, 1916. They had two daughters-Katherine born February 8, 1919, and Rosalie Jeanette Gutenko, born April 21, 1927. He died at his daughter’s home on Payson Street, Baltimore City, Maryland, on October 18, 1963. After a Requiem Mass at Holy Rosary Church, he was buried in the Gutenko Family Plot at Holy Rosary Cemetery. 

By 1928 the boxer “who a few years ago was idolized by ring followers” was ‘practically penniless’ [and] not many years ago [he] had a fortune of $300,000, made out of the ring, and some investments. Now he is broke, and his fighting days are over.”  
Before he began his boxing career, Gutenko had left school after the third grade and worked as an apprentice typesetter. Possibly for one of the Baltimore Polish-language or German newspapers. After losing the title in 1917, he returned to typesetting but left to pursue his boxing career again. After he quit boxing, he would work for Bethlehem Steel in Sparrows Point, Maryland. During World War II, he was featured along with other workers promoting their efforts on behalf of the War.

Professional boxing record
John Gutnko's boxing career began on July 25, 1910, with a knockout win that started a meteoric rise and the race to win the bantamweight title. The latter was achieved because of his second manager Sammy Harris. It was Sammy Harris who, to garner publicity about his protégé John Gutenko reinvented and created a myth about themselves that the writers and fans were willing to accept since it made for good press. The most often repeated tale involved how Harris “discovered” the future bantamweight champion. At Harris’s prompting, Guntenko often told reporters:
I sold him a paper, and he gave me half a dollar to get changed. I ran away with the half dollar. The next time Harris saw me, he took me up to his athletic club to box. He wanted to see me get licked for stealing his half dollar. But I didn’t get licked. And Harris kept me and trained me, and he made me a champion. 

It made for an excellent newspaper copy but was a complete fabrication. Gutenko did not sign with Harris until almost a year after he began his boxing career. Another more plausible explanation was offered by Gutenko a year before his death. In the interview, he told John Sherwood, an Evening Sun writer, that he first put on boxing gloves in the empty stock room of Tom the Greek’s candy store on Eastern Avenue in Baltimore’s Fells’ Point. 

Gutenko’s boxing career was initially managed by local boxing promoter Joe Barrett who arranged for his first match at the Oriole Baseball Park against Shep Ferren. A right-handed punch to Farren’s jaw sent the boxer to the canvas and gave the novice his first win.  

His loss by knockout against George Henry Chaney, born in Baltimore on September 18, 1892, occurred at Baltimore’s Germania Maennerchor Hall on January 2, 1911, eventually leading to him becoming the protégé of promoter and manager Sammy Harris. Under Harris’ tutelage, he began an impressive winning streak. Then, on October 12, 1912, he met the reigning Bantamweight title holder, Johnny Coulon, at Madison Square Garden.  
Much to everyone’s disbelief, he fought the champion to a standstill. “Some of the ringside sharps gave the Kid the shade, and all agreed that the Baltimore lad was entitled to a draw at the worst.” 
The Polish boxer spent the next year and a half trying to force Coulon to a rematch. Although Coulon only fought three bouts during this time, Gutenko continued to take on worthy opponents, including the English (Johnny Hughes) and French (Charles LeDoux) bantamweight champions. 

Finally, when an influential Californian boxing promoter, Tom McCarey, declared Gutenko the bantamweight champion after Coulon repeatedly failed to defend the title, Coulon was forced to step into the ring. Unfortunately, it appears Coulon was right to avoid a rematch as Gutenko knocked him out and became the Bantamweight Champion of the World.

John Gutenko gave several versions of how he acquired the fighting name “Kid Williams.” One of the most details suggests the name came from a Baltimore African American bantamweight boxer who encouraged Gutenko to assume his fighting moniker the night before a fight:

He hunted up his pal that night in order to obtain a line on the game. His friend’s name was Williams. Friend Williams was a regular prizefighter – regular in licking he received. He had just quit the game on that account. Still, Jonathan Gutenko (called ‘Dutch’). That name will never do. They puzzled away until Williams abruptly ended it by exclaiming: ‘Why not use mine? Williams? Sure! 

His nickname the Baltimore Tiger was coined by members of the New York sportswriter fraternity. It may have been former gunslinger turned sportswriter Bat Materson who came up with the moniker as he described Gutenko's aggressive boxing style as like that of a tiger.

Ironically, John Gutenko’s first fight after winning the bantamweight title was against Pete Herman in New Orleans. Unfortunately, the Baltimore Tiger would lose his title three years later to Herman in New Orleans on January 9, 1917. They had met the year before, where Gutenko prevailed, but the third time was not the charm, and he lost by being outpointed. Gutenko never recaptured the title, and on September 9, 1929, the  Maryland State Athletic Commission “decided for the best interests of everyone concerned, including Williams himself, that the Kid would not be allowed to fight anymore in the State.” The action was taken because “the members of the ring body felt that there was danger of the veteran fight suffering serious injury if allowed to continue.” Thus, revoking his license and ending his boxing career.
  
After his death, the boxing world began to acknowledge his “great natural ability as a fighter.”  On December 3, 1966, his brother Rudolph (February 18, 1900-August 6, 1969), a Maryland bicycling champion in the 1920s, represented him when the Baltimore Tiger was elected to the Maryland Athletic Sports Hall of Fame.  The plaque awarded him was later hung “on the Baltimore Civic Center wall.”
  
John Gutenko was not the only member of the family to aspire to a boxing career. His younger brother Louis (September 28, 1895-June 17, 1961) also began his career in 1910 as a lightweight. He remained in his brother’s shadow fighting under the name Young Kid Williams. However, he never achieved fame or a title like his older brother. 

All information in this section is derived from BoxRec, unless otherwise stated.

Official record

All newspaper decisions are officially regarded as “no decision” bouts and are not counted to the win/loss/draw column.

Unofficial record

Record with the inclusion of newspaper decisions to the win/loss/draw column.

See also
List of bantamweight boxing champions

References

External links
 

1893 births
1963 deaths
 Ukrainian emigrants to the United States

International Boxing Hall of Fame inductees
Bantamweight boxers